The 2018 New York State Senate elections were held on November 6, 2018, to elect representatives from all 63 State Senate districts in the U.S. state of New York. Primary elections were held on September 13, 2018.

In April 2018, The Wall Street Journal described the State Senate as the "last bastion of power" of the Republican Party in the State of New York. On Election Day, Democrats gained control of the chamber from the Republicans by picking up eight seats. The following day, The New York Times wrote that the Democrats had "decisively evict[ed] Republicans from running the State Senate, which they [had] controlled for all but three years since World War II". Enrolled Democrats won 40 of the chamber's 63 seats, including all but one seat in New York City and six of the nine seats on Long Island, the latter of which had been under total Republican control since the early 1970s. Brooklyn Senator Simcha Felder, a Democrat who had previously caucused with the Republicans, sought to re-join the Senate Democratic Conference, but was turned down in December 2018; he was later accepted into the Conference on July 1, 2019.

The Democrats' election victories made possible the January 2019 election of Andrea Stewart-Cousins as the first female Majority Leader and Temporary President in the chamber's history.

Party composition

The vote totals for each party were:

Summary of results

Sources:

Retiring incumbents
Five incumbent Republican senators did not seek re-election in 2018. They were:
Thomas Croci (R), District 3
William J. Larkin Jr. (R), District 39
John Bonacic (R), District 42
Kathy Marchione (R), District 43
John A. DeFrancisco (R), District 50

Incumbents defeated

In primary
Seven incumbent Senators (all Democrats) ran for re-election, but were defeated in the September 13 primaries. They were:

Tony Avella (D-District 11)
Jose Peralta (D-District 13)
Martin Malave Dilan (D-District 18)
Jesse Hamilton (D-District 20)
Marisol Alcantara (D-District 31)
Jeffrey D. Klein (D-District 34)
David Valesky (D-District 53)

With the exception of Sen. Dilan, all seven had been members of the Independent Democratic Conference.

In general election
The following Republican incumbents were defeated on Election Day:

Carl L. Marcellino (R-District 5)
Kemp Hannon (R-District 6)
Elaine Phillips (R-District 7)
Martin Golden (R-District 22)
Terrence Murphy (R-District 40)

The six Democratic members of the IDC who were defeated in the September primaries (Sens. Avella, Peralta, Hamilton, Alcantara, Klein, and Valesky) were also on the ballot in November on either the Independence Party line, the Women's Equality Party line, or both (Sen. Peralta also received votes on the Reform Party line). None of the six was re-elected.

Detailed results

The New York State Board of Elections only publishes results for contested primary elections.

Sources:

District 1

District 2

District 3
The 3rd district is located on Long Island and includes Medford, Ronkonkoma, and Sayville. Republican Thomas Croci has represented this district since 2015. Croci did not run for reelection.

District 4

District 5

District 6
In an unexpected upset, Democratic challenger Kevin Thomas defeated Republican incumbent Kemp Hannon.

District 7

District 8

District 9
Democrat Todd Kaminsky was first elected in a 2016 special election.

Reform primary

General election

District 10

District 11

Democratic primary
 Tony Avella, incumbent
 John Liu, former New York City Comptroller

Republican primary

General election

District 12

Reform primary

General election

District 13

Democratic primary
 Jose Peralta, incumbent
 Jessica Ramos, community activist

General election

District 14

District 15

Republican primary

Reform primary

General election

District 16

District 17

Democratic primary
 Simcha Felder, incumbent
 Blake Morris, attorney

General election

District 18

Democratic primary
 Martin Malave Dilan, incumbent
 Julia Salazar, political activist

General election

District 19

District 20

Democratic primary
 Jesse Hamilton, incumbent
 Zellnor Myrie, lawyer and former legislative director in New York City Council

General election

District 21

District 22
Democratic challenger Andrew Gounardes defeated Ross Barkan in the Democratic primary and narrowly defeated Golden in the general election.

Democratic primary
 Ross Barkan, journalist
 Andrew Gounardes, 2012 Democratic nominee for NY-SD22

General election

District 23

Democratic primary
 Jasmine Robinson, legal secretary
 Diane Savino, incumbent
 Brandon Stradford

Reform primary

General election

District 24

District 25

District 26

Reform primary

General election

District 27

District 28

Independence primary

General election

District 29

District 30

District 31

Democratic primary
 Marisol Alcantara, incumbent
 Robert Jackson, former New York City councilman
 Thomas Leon
 Tirso Santiago Pina

General election

District 32
Democrat Luis Sepúlveda has represented this district since winning a special election in April 2018.

District 33

District 34

Democratic primary
 Alessandra Biaggi, Deputy National Operations Director for Hillary Clinton's 2016 presidential campaign
 Jeffrey D. Klein, incumbent

General election

District 35

Democratic primary
 Andrea Stewart-Cousins, incumbent
 Virginia Perez

General election

District 36

District 37
Democrat Shelley Mayer has represented this district since winning a special election in April 2018.

District 38
Democrat David Carlucci, a former member of the Independent Democratic Conference (IDC), was first elected in 2010. Like other former IDC members, Carlucci received a Democratic primary challenge in 2018. After defeating Julie Goldberg in the primary, Carlucci turned back Republican Scott Vanderhoef in the general election.

Democratic primary
 David Carlucci, incumbent
 Julie Goldberg, school librarian

General election

District 39
Republican Sen. William J. Larkin Jr. did not seek re-election.

Reform primary

General election

District 40

Democratic primary

General election

District 41

District 42
Republican John Bonacic, who has represented this district since 1999, did not seek re-election, and was succeeded by Democrat Jen Metzger.

Democratic primary
 Pramilla Malick, 2016 Democratic nominee for NYSD-42
 Jen Metzger, Rosendale town councilwoman

Reform primary

General election

District 43
Republican Kathy Marchione, who had represented this district since 2013, did not seek re-election, and was succeeded by fellow Republican Daphne Jordan.

District 44

District 45

District 46

District 47

District 48

District 49

Reform primary

General election

District 50
Republican John DeFrancisco has represented this district since 1993 and did not seek re-election. As of November 7, 2018, Republican Bob Antonacci led Democrat John Mannion by 2,829 votes and declared victory in the race, although absentee ballots remained to be counted. On November 21, 2018, elections officials confirmed Antonacci's victory.

District 51

District 52

District 53

Democratic primary
 Rachel May, board member of OCRRA and former college professor
 David Valesky, incumbent

General election

District 54

District 55

District 56

District 57

District 58

Democratic primary
 Amanda Kirchgessner, community activist
 Michael Lausell, Schuyler County legislator

General election

District 59

District 60

District 61

District 62

District 63

Democratic primary
 Timothy M. Kennedy (incumbent)
 Shaqurah Zachery, teacher

General election

Aftermath
One question that remained after the 2018 elections was which caucus Democratic Senator Simcha Felder would join. Felder, since his first Senate election in 2012, had been a member of the Republican majority. After the dissolution of the Independent Democratic Conference, Felder remained with the Republicans as the decisive vote for Senate control. Felder maintained throughout his tenure that he would rejoin the Democrats if doing so would benefit his district, but after retaking control of the Senate in the 2018 elections, the Senate Democratic Conference did not allow him to join. Felder was allowed into the Senate Democratic Conference in July 2019; this action gave the Conference a total of 40 members.

Notes

References

Senate
New York State Senate
New York State Senate elections
Independent Democratic Conference